Ewa Trzebińska (née Nelip) is a Polish épée fencer. She earned a silver medal at the 2017 World Championships, silver medal in the 2009 World Championships and won the team gold medal at the 2010 European Fencing Championships.

References

External links
Profile at the European Fencing Confederation
Profile at the International Fencing Federation

Polish female épée fencers
Olympic fencers of Poland
Living people
Sportspeople from Katowice
1989 births
Universiade gold medalists for Poland
Universiade medalists in fencing
European Games competitors for Poland
Fencers at the 2015 European Games
World Fencing Championships medalists
Medalists at the 2009 Summer Universiade
Fencers at the 2020 Summer Olympics
20th-century Polish women
21st-century Polish women